The men's aerials competition of the FIS Freestyle World Ski Championships 2013 was held at Myrkdalen-Voss, Norway on March 6 (qualifying)  and March 7 (finals). 
31 athletes from 12 countries competed.

Qualification
The following are the results of the qualification.

Final
The following are the results of the finals.

References

Aerials, men's